, also known as simply Anza (stylized in all caps), is a Japanese singer and theater actress best known as vocalist of the heavy metal band Head Phones President and for playing Sailor Moon in thirteen separate musical productions.

Biography

Personal life 
Anza was born in Cape Town, South Africa, to a White South African mother and a Japanese father. When they moved to Nagasaki, Japan in her childhood, Anza was not fluent in the Japanese language and was bullied because of her foreign appearance. She has a younger sister named Chiho Oyama who played Sailor Jupiter in Sailor Moon musicals.

Career 
Anza began modeling in junior high school and was invited to shoot a commercial in Nagoya. At fifteen, she made her acting debut on NHK's Chūgakusei Nikki. She made her music debut in 1992 as a member of the pop idol group Sakurakko Club and released a number of singles with them. She and Ayako Morino, also of Sakurakko Club fame, were in a spin-off duo called Momo. They released two singles in 1993 and 1994.

With Anza joining the Sailor Moon musicals in 1993, she appeared regularly on the CD releases for the musicals, both in solo and group songs. From her five-year period as Sailor Moon, she can be heard on the "La Soldier" single (released prior to the very first musical), the first five Memorial Album of the Musical releases, as well as three of the eight compilation albums which have been released since the musicals' conception.

In 1994, Moon Lips, a group of actresses from the musicals including Anza, provided vocals for the Sailor Moon anime's theme song "Moonlight Densetsu". It was used for the show's third and fourth seasons, known as Sailor Moon S and Sailor Moon Super S, respectively.

Shortly following her graduation from the Sailor Moon musicals in 1998, she released a solo single entitled "Dream" under the Sony Music Entertainment Japan record label. "Dream" was also featured as the ending theme song for the TV show Famitsu Wave. In April 1999, she released "Tobira wo Akete" (under Victor Entertainment), a single which was used as a theme song for the anime Cardcaptor Sakura. In September 1999, Anza provided vocals for "Ai wo Shizumeteru", the ending theme song to the PlayStation game Psychic Force 2. Another of her songs, "Mienai Chizu", was used as an insert song in episode 68 of Cardcaptor Sakura.

In 1999, Anza went in a completely different direction with her music. She formed Head Phones President with brothers Hiro and Mar, who previously helped her on her solo work. They are a heavy metal band, with occasional harsh, screamed vocals interspersed with soft melodic singing. Anza is often introduced as being on "vocals and visuals". They have referred to their music as "'negative', due to their emotional lyrics that stem from traumatic experiences, [but] believe their music expresses their struggles in a hopeful manner." A lot of the lyrics come from Anza; the song "Alienblood" represents her own troubles growing up in Japan as mixed race.

In 2003, Toho recorded four of its Les Misérables musicals live, and they released four double-disc albums (available only by special order directly from Toho). Anza appears on the light blue album with Kazutaka Ishii as Jean Valjean.

In 2006, Anza was signed onto the Universal Music Japan and released her debut single with them: "Kanata e". It was used as the second ending theme song for the anime Glass no Kantai.

In late 2008, she joined the rock band Vitamin-Q along with Masami Tsuchiya, Kazuhiko Katō, Gota Yashiki and Rei Ohara. However, after Katō's suicide on October 17, 2009, the group ceased activity.

In 2011, Anza started a webshop in collaboration with Riho, "Raz -Rabbit" is a shop of clothes and accessories.

On May 1, 2011, Anza performed a solo show in support of 2011 Tōhoku earthquake and tsunami victims. At the show, nominated "Anza's Box", she sang songs from musicals SeraMyu, Gift, Les Misérables, beyond musics from solo career and participation of Iwana Misako (from SeraMyu), Manabu Oda (from musical Gift) and her band Head Phones President.

On December 24, 2011, Anza performed on "Live & Cafe Bar Rocky", in Tokyo, the solo show "Anza Xmas Live". The show had participation of Tomo (key), Hiro (guitar), Norio Yoshida (bass), Sakaguchi Masaru (percussion) and Maddie as a special guest. In addition to the songs from the previous show, she sang Christmas songs dressed in Santa Claus costume.

In late 2012, Anza was featured on the song "Unmei no Megami" from the group Dragon Guardian, at the album The Best of Dragon Guardian Saga.

Since 2013, Anza has performed as a DJ sporadically, alone or with her bandmate Narumi.

On May 24, 2014, Anza celebrated her 22 years of career in the show "Anza Solo Live" with participation of musicians Kato Tomoko, HIRO and Sakaguchi Masaru, in addition to special guests Okuyama Momoko, Iwana Misako (formerly Kotani Misako), Oda Manabu, Haruka (Rouse Garden) and Fujiwara Yuki. On sale at the concert had a small "ANZA BOOK" celebrating her 22-year career's day and a new T-shirt designed by Anza's collaboration brand RAZ.

The music of Head Phones President was the genesis of the rock musical Stand in the World written and directed by Shohei Hayashi, which ran at the Tokyo Arts Center from June 11–13, 2016. The band performed during the show which stars Erika Yamakawa, Manabu Oda and Hikari Ono.

For the 15th anniversary of the PGS SPECIAL STORE, RAZ was in a physical store in Ikebukuro from November 10 to 28, 2016.

On December 2, 2016, Anza performed the show "Anza Solo Live" on "New eight", in Kamata, Tokyo. The show had participation of Iwana Misako, in addition to the musicians Key_TOMO and Gt_HIRO. On May 4, 2017, Anza performed the show "ANZA Birthday Live" in the same place, with the same guests, with additional participation of Oda Manabu.

On February 26, 2017, Anza made a guest appearance on JENOFES at Ikebukuro Live Inn Rosa, Tokyo JAPAN.

On March 25, 2017, Anza started the column "Good times for a change ☆" at BEEAST web rock magazine.

Anza solo 20th anniversary, RAZ 7th anniversary SPECIAL LIVE "ANZA WORLD" was on July 13, 2018 at Sengawa Fix Hall with guests Iwana Misako and NANA(REASTERISK); musicians TOMO and HIRO; Apparel RAZ; dj NARUMI and models Chiro, AREA, iPo, Nagano Erina, Misato Koromo, Otaki Tetsutaro and Ayami Rika.

Stage career 
Anza has performed in a number of stage productions, the majority of which being musicals. Her first major production was as the leading role of Sailor Moon in the Sailor Moon musicals, commonly known as Sera Myu. She is one of the longest-running cast members to ever perform in the Sailor Moon musicals and is the longest-running Sailor Moon to date. She held the role for five years performing in thirteen separate productions between 1993 and 1998.

Nearing the end of her stretch as Sailor Moon, she also performed in a musical called 2050-nen no Aoi Shima between 1997 and 1998. Chiruchiru was the name of her character. In 2000, she broke off from the musical scene in a Japanese stage production of Mr. Holland's Opus. Similarly, in 2002, she was in a Japanese stage production of When Harry Met Sally....

In 2003, Anza returned to doing musicals by taking on the role of Eponine in several Toho productions of Les Misérables through till 2006. In 2004, Anza appeared as Ellen in one production of Miss Saigon (also produced by Toho) as well as a Japanese adaptation of Anton Chekhov's Three Sisters in the role of Irina.

She also appeared in Vamps' 2009 music video for their cover of Shampoo's "Trouble".

Discography 
Solo
 
 "Dream" (April 18, 1998)
  – 2nd opening theme song to the Cardcaptor Sakura anime
  – ending theme song to the Glass no Kantai anime
  – ending theme song to the Pretty Guardian Sailor Moon Eternal: The Movie Part 2 anime

With Sakurakko Club Sakura-gumi
 
 
 
 
 

With Momo
 Just Combination (1993)
 Summer Candle -Momo in New Caledonia (VHS, 1993)
 Pocket Bell Night wa 5643# (1994)

With SeraMyu
 Memorial Album of the Musical “Pretty Soldier Sailor Moon”: An Alternate Legend: The Dark Kingdom Revival Story
 Memorial Album of the Musical 2 “Pretty Soldier Sailor Moon S”: Usagi — The Path to Become the Soldier of Love
 Memorial Album of the Musical 3 “Pretty Soldier Sailor Moon SuperS”: Dream Warriors — Love — Into Eternity...
 Memorial Album of the Musical 4 “Pretty Soldier Sailor Moon Sailor Stars”
 Memorial Album of the Musical 5 “Pretty Soldier Sailor Moon” Eternal Legend
 Memorial Album of the Musical “Pretty Soldier Sailor Moon”: ~ Best Sound Track ~
 Memorial Album of the Musical “Pretty Soldier Sailor Moon”: Theme Songs 1993~1999
 Memorial Album of the Musical “Pretty Soldier Sailor Moon”: Best Songs Collection —Best Songs Chosen by Fans—
 Memorial Album of the Musical “Pretty Soldier Sailor Moon”: Love Ballad Edition
 Memorial Album of the Musical “Pretty Soldier Sailor Moon”: Dark Side Edition: Best Songs

With Head Phones President
See Head Phones President discography

With Vitamin-Q
 Vitamin-Q Featuring Anza (December 12, 2008)

Other
 "Mienai Chizu" - song insert at episode 68 of Cardcaptor Sakura
 "Ai wo Shizumeteru" - the ending theme song of the PlayStation game Psychic Force 2, 1999
  - Dragon Guardian, at album The Best of Dragon Guardian Saga"

 Musicals 
Anza performed as Usagi Tsukino/Sailor Moon in the following musicals:
 1993 - Summer Special Musical Bishoujo Senshi Sailor Moon - Gaiden Dark Kingdom Fukkatsu Hen
 1994 - Winter Special Musical Bishoujo Senshi Sailor Moon - Gaiden Dark Kingdom Fukkatsu Hen-(Kaiteiban)
 1994 - Bishoujo Senshi Sailor Moon - Super Spring Festival
 1994 - Summer Special Musical Bishoujo Senshi Sailor Moon S - Usagi: Ai no Senshi e no Michi
 1995 - Winter Special Musical Bishoujo Senshi Sailor Moon S - Henshin – Super Senshi e no Michi-
 1995 - Spring Spring Special Musical Bishoujo Senshi Sailor Moon S - Henshin - Super Senshi e no Michi (Kaiteiban)
 1995 - Summer Special Musical Bishoujo Senshi Sailor Moon SuperS - Yume Senshi - Ai - Eien ni...
 1996 - Spring Special Musical Bishoujo Senshi Sailor Moon SuperS - (Kaiteiban) Yume Senshi - Ai - Eien ni... Saturn Fukkatsu Hen
 1996 - Bishoujo Senshi Sailor Moon SuperS - Special Musical Show
 1996 - Summer Special Musical Bishoujo Senshi Sailor Moon - Sailor Stars
 1997 - Winter Special Musical Bishoujo Senshi Sailor Moon - Sailor Stars (Kaiteiban)
 1997 - Summer Special Musical Bishoujo Senshi - Eien Densetsu
 1998 - Winter Special Musical Bishoujo Senshi - Eien Densetsu (Kaiteiban) - The Final First Stage

As herself/guest
 1998 - Golden Week Fan Kansha Event 1999 - Boys Be ... Alive 2000 - 500kai Kouen Kinen - 500th Performance Special~ 2002 Spring 10th Anniversary Festival
 Dai 2 Bu - Memorial Talk & Live Show
 777kai Kouen Kinen - 777th Performance of Sera Myu

Other musicals
 1997–1998 - Chiruchiru in 2050 no Aoi Tori 2000 - Rowena Morgan in Mr. Holland's Opus 2002 - Emily Diner in When Harry Met Sally... 2003–2006 - Eponine in Les Misérables.
 2004 - Ellen in Miss Saigon.
 2004 - Irina Sergeyevna Prozorova in Three Sisters.
 2006, 2009, 2013 - Ayaka in Gift.
 2007 - Sint-Margherita in Ai, Toki wo Koete Sekigahara Ibun 2008 - Julia in Rag and Jewelry.
 2008 - Homma Ayako in Only You Really Musical.
 2008 - Tsukino Yayoi in Ninshin Sasete 2008 - Julia (Sawamoto Yuriko) in Boro to Houseki 2008 - Honma Ayako in Kiss Yori mo Setsunaku 2009 - Madeleine in The Umbrellas of Cherbourg 2009 - Amneris in Aida 2016 - Hikaru in STAND IN THE WORLD - THE ROCK MUSICAL SHOW Filmography 
 [1992] Susume! Chikyū bōei shōjo-tai (Earth Defense Corps Girl! Promoted)  - herself
 [1992] Chuugakusei Nikki (Junior High School Diary) - herself
 [1998] Shin Megami Tensei: Devil Summoner - Kamiya Tōichirō
 [2009] Trouble - music video for Vamps

 Photobooks 
 Anza Complete'' (1997)

References

External links 

 
 
 
 

1976 births
Living people
Actors from Nagasaki Prefecture
Anime musicians
English-language singers from Japan
Former Stardust Promotion artists
Japanese child actresses
Japanese child singers
Japanese women heavy metal singers
Japanese women pop singers
Japanese women rock singers
Japanese idols
Japanese stage actresses
Musicians from Nagasaki Prefecture
Nu metal singers
South African emigrants to Japan
20th-century Japanese actresses
21st-century Japanese actresses
20th-century Japanese women singers
20th-century Japanese singers
21st-century Japanese women singers
21st-century Japanese singers
Actresses from Cape Town